Blade Master is a scrolling hack and slash arcade game released by Irem in 1991. Two selectable heroes, Roy and Arnold, try to save their land from hordes of monsters. There are items to break and power-ups to collect, typical of this genre in the 1990s.

Gameplay

Synopsis

Development and release

Reception 

In Japan, Game Machine listed it on their August 15, 1991 issue as being the fifteenth most-successful table arcade unit of the month, outperforming titles such as Vimana and King of the Monsters. British gaming magazine The One for Amiga Games reviewed Blade Master in August 1991, calling it a "masterpiece", stating that "Irem has certainly pulled out all the stops here - beautifully crafted animated sprites, lovely backgrounds, excellent gameplay, sampled sound", and furthermore calls the combat "satisfying". In the October 1991 issue of Japanese publication Micom BASIC Magazine, the game was ranked on the number fourteen spot in popularity.

Notes

References

External links 

Blade Master @ Arcade-History

1991 video games
Arcade video games
Arcade-only video games
Fantasy video games
Hack and slash games
Irem games
Side-scrolling beat 'em ups
Video games developed in Japan